John Barker (fl. ca. 1471–1482) was first recorded as a King's Scholar at Eton College about 1471. He went to King's College in 1474, was elected a fellow in 1477, and graduated MA in 1479.  His Etonian connection may indicate that he was from the south of England.

Barker taught logic to "sophisters" (second-year undergraduates) using his own text, the Scutum inexpugnabile. No copy survives, but it was probably an introduction to Aristotelian logic and modal grammar. Brian Rowe, who came up to King's in 1499, wrote a commendatory preface for it in the early 16th century, indicating that it was then still in use in the college. Barker left King's in 1482, approximately the year John Fisher and John Colet came to Cambridge, and later joined the Franciscans. The date and place of his death are unknown.

References

15th-century English writers
Fellows of King's College, Cambridge
English Franciscans
Year of birth uncertain
Year of death missing
Eton King's Scholars
Alumni of King's College, Cambridge
English philosophers
English male non-fiction writers